Joyce Cavalccante is a Brazilian author of seven novels, plus several short stories and articles that today appear in eight anthologies.  Cavalccante's writings focus on the plight of women in Brazil who live to pray, marry and die. She is the president of REBRA, the Brazilian Women Writers' Network.

Published books 

 The Devil Sucking Mango - Bertrand Brasil  Publisher - 2001 - RJ - Novel.
 Intimate Enemies: No Sin South Of The Equator -IUniverse publisher - NYC. - 1st  edition 2000. Novel. English translation by Leland Guyer.
 Intimate Enemies (Inimigas  Intimas)  -  Novel -  Maltese Publisher - São Paulo - Brazil  - 1993 1st edition - 1994 2nd edition. Award Best Fiction 1993. Novel.
 Mystical Details (Retalhos Misticos) - Collection of Serigraphies and text with the artist Elvio Becheroni - John Doo Editor - São Paulo - Brazil - 1988. Short stories.
 The Discourse Of An Absurd Woman (O Discurso Da  Mulher Absurda) - Short stories - Global Publisher - São Paulo - Brazil - 1985 1st edition - Maltese Publisher - São Paulo - Brazil - 1994 2nd edition.
 Free & Object (Livre E Objeto) - Poems in Prose  - Massao Ohno Editions - São Paulo - Brazil - 1980.
 Eve's Rib (Costela De Eva) - Novel  - Global Publisher - São Paulo - Brazil - 1980. 
 From Within Outward (De Dentro Para Fora) - Novel - Referencia Publisher - São Paulo - Brazil- 1978.
 Brasiliansk Litteratur - Fran Urskog Till Megadtad - Anthology of Brazilian Literature - Fabians Forlag Publisher - Stockholm - Sweden - 1994.
 Letters On The Sun (Letras Ao Sol) - Anthology - Demócrito Rocha Foundation Editions - Fortaleza - Brazil - 1996. 
 The Talent Of Ceara In Short Stories (O Talento Cearense Em Contos) - Anthology -  Maltese Publisher/ SECULT - São Paulo - Brazil - 1996.
 Against Murmur (Contra Lamuria) - Anthology - Pindaíba Publisher House - São Paulo - Brazil - 1994. 
 The Man Who Has A Fish Between His Legs (L'Uomo Che Aveva Un Pesce Fra Le Gambe)  - Short story. Narrasud, scritti e percorsi migratori, revista bimestrale - anno I - n 2, pag. 42. Italy.
 Short Stories From Ceara Anthology (Antologia Do Conto Cearense)  - Tukano Edition - Fortaleza, Brasil - 1990 - Anthology .
 The Other Side Of The Gaze (O Outro Lado Do Olhar). Verano Publisher - Brasília, Brazil - 1988 - Anthology.
 Paulistas Short Stories (Contos Paulistas) - Editora Mercado Aberto  Publisher - Porto Alegre, Brasil  - 1988 - Anthology.
 Pirandelian Short Stories (Contos Pirandelianos). Brasiliense Publisher- S.P.  Brasil - 1985 - Anthology.

External links
Official site
Rede de Escritoras Brasileiras

20th-century Brazilian novelists
Brazilian women novelists
Brazilian women short story writers
20th-century Brazilian short story writers
Living people
Year of birth missing (living people)
20th-century Brazilian women writers
21st-century Brazilian novelists
21st-century Brazilian women writers